GRJ may refer to:

 George Airport, an airport in George, South Africa
 Gradshteyn and Ryzhik (and Jeffrey) aka Table of Integrals, Series, and Products, a classical book in mathematics
 Jabo language, by ISO-639 code